Vedavågen Church is a parish church of the Church of Norway in Karmøy Municipality in Rogaland county, Norway. It is located in the village of Veavågen on the western coast of the island of Karmøy. It is the church for the Vedavågen  parish which is part of the Karmøy prosti (arch-deanery) in the Diocese of Stavanger. The concrete church was built in a long church style in 2009 using designs by the architectural firm: Brandsberg Dahls-Arkitekter. The church seats about 280 people.

The elementary school right besides it uses the building for classrooms, as the school does not have enough classrooms for all of the student body.

See also
List of churches in Rogaland

References

Karmøy
Churches in Rogaland
21st-century Church of Norway church buildings
Churches completed in 2009
2009 establishments in Norway